Batuhan Ahmet Şen (born 3 February 1999) is a Turkish professional footballer who plays as a goalkeeper for the Turkish club Fatih Karagümrük in the Süper Lig on loan from Galatasaray.

Professional career

Galatasaray
Galatasaray announced on August 9, 2022 that Şen's contract was extended until the end of the 2025-26 season.

Hekimoğlu Trabzon (loan)
On 16 January 2020, Galatasaray officially announced that the 20-year-old net keeper Batuhan was loaned to Hekimoğlu Trabzon.

Menemenspor (loan)
On 26 January 2021, Galatasaray hired young goalkeeper Batuhan to Menemenspor, coached by Ümit Karan.

Fatih Karagümrük (loan)
Galatasaray announced on 9 August 2022 that young goalkeeper Şen was loaned to the Süper Lig team Fatih Karagümrük club for 1 year.

References

External links

1999 births
Living people
People from Bakırköy
Footballers from Istanbul
Turkish footballers
Turkey youth international footballers
Turkey B international footballers
Association football goalkeepers
Galatasaray S.K. footballers
1461 Trabzon footballers
Menemenspor footballers
Fatih Karagümrük S.K. footballers
Süper Lig players
TFF First League players
TFF Second League players